The 152nd Pennsylvania House of Representatives District is located in Montgomery County and Philadelphia and includes the following areas:

 Montgomery County
 Bryn Athyn
 Hatboro
 Lower Moreland Township
 Upper Dublin Township (PART, Districts 03, 06 and 07)
 Upper Moreland Township
 Philadelphia (PART, Ward 63 [PART, Divisions 16, 17, 18, 19, 20, 21 and 24])

Representatives

References

152
Government of Montgomery County, Pennsylvania
Government of Philadelphia